Science Fiction and Fantasy Writers Association Grand Master and Science Fiction Hall of Fame inductee James E. Gunn founded the Center for the Study of Science Fiction (renamed in 1991 to the "J Wayne and Elsie M Gunn Center for the Study of Science Fiction" after his brother made a substantial endowment, in honor of their parents) as an official Kansas Board of Regents Center in 1982-1983, as an umbrella for his science fiction activities at the University of Kansas in Lawrence, KS, under the KU Center for Humanistic Studies. It was the first such research center, emerging from the science-fiction (SF) programs Gunn created at the university beginning in 1969. Under the direction of Gunn and his successors, the center established affiliations across KU and the world, and through gifts and endowments served as a focus for annual not-for-credit workshops, lectures, student and international awards, the annual summer Campbell Conference (renamed the "Gunn Center Conference" by long-time director Christopher McKitterick in its final years), fan activity, and other SF-related programs at the University of Kansas and beyond. Professor of English Giselle Anatol now serves as Director since January 2022. The Center promotes for-credit courses from various KU departments, hosts book discussions, and hosts the new Sturgeon Symposium conference.

History 
James Gunn's original Center was officially founded as a Kansas Board of Regents Center in 1982-1983 by James Gunn, housed under the Center for Humanistic Studies, which later became the Hall Center.  

Prior to the formal establishment of the Center, in 1968, James Gunn, then public relations writer for the Chancellor of the University of Kansas, began filming a series of interviews, talks, and lectures as resources for his upcoming science fiction course and for others teaching science fiction. The next year, Gunn offered his first Science Fiction Studies course at the University of Kansas in 1969. This was one of the first of its kind taught in a university setting. In 1975, Gunn held his first Intensive Institute on the Teaching of Science Fiction, originally as a not-for-credit, four-week summer course covering the history of SF in both short fiction and novels.

In 1978, prior to the Center’s creation, Gunn established the Campbell Conference as a venue for authors and scholars to discuss the genre and to present the John M. Campbell Memorial Award for best science fiction novel (which had been established in 1973). The Conference was in 2018 renamed the Gunn Center Conference.

Since 1982 the SF Special Collection has become KU's fastest-growing research collection, primarily through gifts. The KU Kenneth Spencer Research Library also holds multimedia materials, ephemera, fanzines, magazines, original manuscripts and papers from a large number of authors (including a major acquisition of Theodore Sturgeon's papers), and more.

In 1987, the Theodore Sturgeon Memorial Award for the best short science fiction was established by Gunn and the heirs of Theodore Sturgeon, including Sturgeon's partner Jayne Engelhart Tannehill and his children, as an appropriate memorial to one of the great short-story writers in a field distinguished by its short fiction. In 1995, the award was reorganized as a juried award and brought under the aegis of the Center.

In 1991, Dr. Richard W. Gunn, a retired physician in Kansas City and Professor Gunn's brother, created the primary Endowment fund for the Center, and it was renamed the J. Wayne and Elsie M. Gunn Center in honor of their parents. 

In 1996 the Center and the Kansas City Science Fiction and Fantasy Society established the Science Fiction and Fantasy Hall of Fame. The Chairmen were Keith Stokes (1996–2001) and Robin Wayne Bailey (2002–2004). Four authors were inducted annually as part of the center's Conference until 2004, when the Science Fiction Hall of Fame moved to Seattle to become part of the Museum of Pop Culture.

In 2002, authors Christopher McKitterick and Kij Johnson moved to Lawrence, KS, to work more closely with Gunn after years of serving as Assistant Directors, expand the Center's programs, and teach science fiction and creative writing at the University of Kansas. McKitterick served as Director of the Center until 2021-2022; Johnson served as Associate Director of the Center until 2022. 

In 2004, the Richard W. Gunn Memorial Lecture Series was established by an endowment from Richard W. Gunn's estate. Lecturers in SF have included Michael Dirda, Cory Doctorow, Karen Joy Fowler, China Miéville, Nöel Sturgeon, Gary K. Wolfe, and many others. Center affiliates have also brought other guest speakers to Lawrence. Also in 2004, Gunn formed the Center's Board of Advisors (originally named the Board of Trustees) consisting of luminaries and Center advocates from across the SF community to help support the center’s missions.

In 2005, Center directors, SFWA, and others co-launched the AboutSF educational-outreach and speaker-coordination program, active until COVID-19 struck in 2020 . In the same year, Johnson established her SF/F Novel Writing Workshop, the first of its kind, which would later be called the "Fantasy and Science Fiction Novel Master Class," which Johnson co-teaches with author Barbara Webb. Johnson and Webb continue to offer the workshop independently.

In 2007, KU provided the center with its first office for a collection of science fiction books, publications, and multimedia materials, in Wescoe Hall. 

In 2015 the center established its first affiliated office at St. Teresa's College in Ernakulam in Kerala, India, with Professor Latha Nair as director. Nair had previously attended the Campbell Conference and the summer SF Institute.

In May, 2013, James Gunn created an endowment to establish the James E. and Jane F. Gunn Professorship in Science Fiction (named for himself and his late wife) in the future, to support the Center’s educational and scholarly missions.

As of January 2022, Giselle Anatol serves as director. In 2022, the center launched the new Sturgeon Symposium, an annual conference on SF Studies that features the presentation of the Theodore Sturgeon Award. In January 2022, the Center began hosting virtual book club events each month to build community and showcase the diversity of SF literature and authors. The Center recently has begun the immense task of creating an inventory and catalogue for its vast holdings of SF books and multimedia materials.

Programs

Awards
Since 1987, the Center for the Study of Science Fiction has presented the Theodore Sturgeon Memorial Award for the best short science fiction of the year.

From 2005 to 2021, the Center awarded the James E. Gunn Award for Science Fiction Writing for best science-fiction story written for a KU class. Long-time director McKitterick established the award to honor his mentor. 

Starting in 2022, new director Anatol established the Gunn Center Award for Speculative Fiction, a student writing prize in honor of the center's founder.

From 1979-2018, the Center presented the John W. Campbell Memorial Award for the best science-fiction novel of the year.

Previous Center activities also included hosting the induction of honorees into the Science Fiction Hall of Fame(1996-2004), offering 
the Scholarship in Science Fiction Studies for studying or writing science fiction at the University of Kansas (2009-2019), recognizing a Speculative Fiction Writing Workshop author‘s improvements with the Silver Lining Award (a shiny robot and name on a permanent trophy, 2010-2020),, and offering the Mark Bourne Speculative Fiction Writing Scholarship in honor of a man who devoted his life to speculative fiction (2016-2019).

Campbell Conference and Sturgeon Symposium
The center's Conference (traditionally called "Campbell Conference and Awards") was an academic science fiction event held yearly by Gunn, Johnson, and McKitterick until cancellations due to the COVID pandemic. The conference was once the concluding event of their writing workshops and the kickoff event for their advanced writing workshops and Intensive Institute on the Teaching of Science Fiction. Held regularly at the University of Kansas from 1973 to 2019 (except for a joint event in 2007 with the Science Fiction Research Association, the Heinlein Centennial, and MidAmeriCon II in 2016), the conference offered a round-table discussion on a single topic as well as live readings, academic presentations, movie screenings, and book-signings by attending authors, and provided a setting for the presentation of two science-fiction honors: the John W. Campbell Memorial Award and the Theodore Sturgeon Memorial Award. 

Beginning in 2004, winners of the Campbell and Sturgeon Awards received personalized trophies. Permanent trophies remain with the awards juries and make an appearance at the conference and other events.

In 2022, the Center launched the Sturgeon Symposium, which celebrated global SF Studies and included the presentation of the Theodore Sturgeon Memorial Award for best science fiction short story and a reading from the winner. The 2022 winner was Nalo Hopkinson for “Broad Dutty Water: A Sunken Story.”  The second annual Sturgeon Symposium will take place in September 2023 with the theme "Fantastic Worlds, Fraught Futures,” inspired by Octavia Butler’s groundbreaking novel The Parable of the Sower, which celebrates its 30th anniversary this year.

Writing Workshops
In 1985, Gunn established his Science Fiction Writers Workshop (which McKitterick renamed the Speculative Fiction Writing Workshop after Gunn handed off leadership in 2010) as an annual event. Gunn led it (with appearances from Sturgeon Award- and Campbell Award-winning authors) until 1996, when Christopher McKitterick and Kij Johnson began co-teaching. Over the years, guest instructors have included Pat Cadigan, Bradley Denton, Andy Duncan, and John Kessel, with appearances from Sturgeon Award- and Campbell Award-winning authors. Starting in 2016, Johnson and McKitterick established Repeat Offenders advanced workshops for their alumni. Since 2021, these workshops are now offered under the auspices of the Ad Astra Institute for Science Fiction and the Speculative Imagination. 
 
In 2005, Kij Johnson established her Science Fiction & Fantasy Novel Writers Workshop as part of summer workshop offerings. Starting in 2010, she began offering a Repeat Offenders advanced workshop for alumni. Johnson offers her workshops independently.

In 2015, Center director McKitterick established the Young Adult Speculative-Fiction Writing Workshop, led first by Tessa Gratton and Natalie C. Parker, and most recently by Tina Connolly. These authors now offer these workshops independently.

SF Courses
In 2005, Gunn, McKitterick, KU Physics Professor Phillip Baringer, and KU Economics Professor Mohamed El-Hodiri first offered their regular-semester course Science, Technology, and Society: Examining the Future Through a Science-Fiction Lens at KU, which was offered annually for credit until 2020, and is now offered through the Ad Astra Institute for Science Fiction & the Speculative Imagination.

Other course offerings have included McKitterick's Literature of Science Fiction  (alternating each year between the SF novel and short story) and Science Fiction and the Popular Media, plus the Center has always promoted courses on topics related to fantasy, science fiction, and speculative-fiction writing. Current Director Giselle Anatol teaches courses in fantasy, young adult literature, African American literature, and Black speculative fiction. Other KU faculty from English, French and Francophone literatures, and Slavic and Eurasian literatures offer SF and SFF-related coursework that the Center promotes.

AboutSF
In 2005, with donations from SFRA, SFWA, publishers, conventions, and individuals concerned with the field, Gunn and McKitterick established AboutSF, an educational outreach organization whose primary goal was to engage and encourage educators to teach science fiction, and support them in their efforts. As part of this effort, course syllabi and other reference materials were shared online. AboutSF has hosted Teaching Science Fiction workshops at several conventions in the past, notably for the LoneStarCon. KU ceased supporting AboutSF in 2020, and since then the educational outreach program has continued independently.

James Gunn's Ad Astra
James Gunn's Ad Astra is an online and print magazine that publishes both fiction and scholarly articles in the field of science fiction. Ad Astra was founded in 2012 by McKitterick and former AboutSF Volunteer Coordinator Isaac Bell; they published the first issue in July 2012. As of March 2023, Ad Astra has published 11 issues. Editor-in-Chief is Jean Asselin, and several alumni of the Speculative Fiction Writing Workshop serve as editors.

Staff 
James Gunn was the founder of the center, and served on the Board of Directors until his death in December, 2020. From 1992-2001, Christopher McKitterick served as Assistant Director then Associate Director in 2002, then Director from 2010-2022. From 1996-2003, Kij Johnson served as Assistant Director then Associate Director in 2004 (until 2022). Giselle Anatol is the current Director (2022-present). A rotating number of students and other volunteers comprise the full staff, and faculty across the university are affiliated with the Center.

References

External links 

University of Kansas
Science fiction studies organizations
Organizations established in 1970
Organizations based in Kansas
1968 establishments in Kansas